Social Science Information/Information sur les sciences sociales is a peer-reviewed academic journal that covers social science. The journal's editor-in-chief is Anne Rocha Perazzo (School for Advanced Studies in the Social Sciences). It was established in 1962 and is currently published by SAGE Publications on behalf of the Fondation Maison des Sciences de l’Homme. The journal publishes articles in both English and French.

Abstracting and indexing 
The journal is abstracted and indexed in Scopus and the Social Sciences Citation Index. According to the Journal Citation Reports, its 2010 impact factor is 0.550, ranking it 48 out of 77 journals in the category "Information Science & Library Science" and 51 out of 83 journals in the category "Social Sciences, Interdisciplinary".

References

External links 
 
 Fondation Maison des Sciences de l’Homme

SAGE Publishing academic journals
Multilingual journals
Quarterly journals
Sociology journals
Publications established in 1962